Microvirgula aerodenitrificans is a species of bacteria, the only species in its genus. It is a Gram-negative, catalase-and oxidase-positive, curved rod-shaped and motile denitrifier. It is aerobic as well as an anoxic heterotroph, having an atypical respiratory type of metabolism in which oxygen and nitrogen oxides are used simultaneously as terminal electron acceptors. SGLY2T is its type strain.

References

Further reading
Patureau, D., et al. "Physiological, molecular and modeling studies of an aerobic denitrifier: Microvirgula aerodenitrificans. Use of its properties in an integrated nitrogen removal plant." Water science and technology 38.1 (1998): 167–175.

External links
LPSN
Type strain of Microvirgula aerodenitrificans at BacDive -  the Bacterial Diversity Metadatabase

Neisseriales
Bacteria described in 1998